The 2017–18 Big 12 men's basketball season began with practices in October 2017, followed by the start of the 2017–18 NCAA Division I men's basketball season in November. Regular season conference play started on December 29, 2017 and concluded on March 3, 2018. The Big 12 tournament began on March 7, with the championship game on March 10, played at the Sprint Center in Kansas City, Missouri. Kansas won the regular season conference title, their NCAA record 14th consecutive year winning the regular season title.

Coaches

Coaching changes 
On March 18, 2017, head coach Brad Underwood left Oklahoma State to accept the head coaching position at Illinois after one year at OSU. The school promoted assistant coach Mike Boynton Jr. to head coach on March 24.

Head coaches 
Note: Stats are through the end of the season. All stats and records are from time at current school only.

Preseason

Big 12 Preseason Poll

Pre-Season All-Big 12 Team

Player of the Year: Devonte' Graham, Kansas
Newcomer of the Year: Malik Newman, Kansas
Freshman of the Year: Mohamed Bamba, Texas

Preseason watchlists

Tournaments

Rankings

Regular season

Conference matrix

Big 12 vs Power 5 matchups
This is a list of the power conference teams (ACC, Big 10, Pac-12 and SEC) the Big 12 plays in the non-conference (Rankings from the AP Poll):

Big 12/SEC Challenge

Postseason

Big 12 tournament

  March 7–10, 2018–Big 12 Conference Basketball Tournament, Sprint Center, Kansas City, MO.

Bracket

NCAA tournament

NIT

Honors and awards

All-Americans

To earn "consensus" status, a player must win honors from a majority of the following teams: the 
Associated Press, the USBWA, Sporting News, and the National Association of Basketball Coaches.

All-Big 12 awards and teams

Phillips 66 Player of the Week

See also
 2017–18 NCAA Division I men's basketball season
 Big 12 Conference
 Big 12 Conference men's basketball
 Big 12/SEC Challenge

References